Sergiy Stakhovsky was the defending champion but chose not to defend his title.

Thomas Fabbiano won the title after defeating Kwon Soon-woo 1–6, 6–4, 6–3 in the final.

Seeds

Draw

Finals

Top half

Bottom half

References
Main Draw
Qualifying Draw

Seoul Open Challenger - Singles
2017 Singles